C. B. Zaman is a Bangladeshi film director, actor, and model who directed many Dhallywood movies. Besides direction he also acted in films.

Biography
Zaman was born in Gauripur, Assam to Imadur Rahman Chowdhury and Sharifa Khatun Chowdhury. He was a student of M C College.

Zaman directed films between 1973 and 1990. His direction Puroskar won National Film Awards in 1983 in five categories. He also directed films like Ujan Bhati and Kusum Koli. These films are selected for preservation in Bangladesh Film Archive. Kusum Koli was his last direction which was released in 1990.

Besides direction Zaman also acted in films. He made his acting career debut with Arun Barun Kiron Mala. He also appeared in two television commercials as a model.

Zaman was married to Fatema Zaman. Chowdhury Farhaduzzam is their only son.

Selected filmography

Director
 Jhorer Pakhi 
 Ujan Bhati 
 Puroskar 
 Shuvoratri
 Hasi
 Lal Golap
 Kusum Koli

Actor
 Orun Borun Kiron Mala
 Iye Kore Biye 
 Chena Ochena 
 Din Jay Kotha Thake 
 Trirotno 
 Ek Takar Bou 
 Neel Achol 
 Valobasar Shesh Nei 
 Biyer Prostab

References

Living people
Bangladeshi film directors
Bangladeshi male film actors
Bangladeshi male models
Murari Chand College alumni
Year of birth missing (living people)